The 1973 National Invitation Tournament was the 1973 edition of the annual NCAA college basketball competition.  The tournament started on March 17 and concluded on March 25, with all fifteen games at Madison Square Garden in New York City. It was won by Virginia Tech, which won its four games by a total of five points, including a 92–91 overtime victory over Notre Dame.

Selected teams
Below is a list of the 16 teams selected for the tournament. For the first time, the Pacific-8 Conference allowed a member to participate; USC fell to Notre Dame by four points in the opening round.

 Alabama
 American
 Fairfield
 Louisville
 Manhattan
 Marshall
 Massachusetts
 Minnesota
 Missouri
 New Mexico
 North Carolina
 Notre Dame
 Oral Roberts
 Rutgers
 USC
 Virginia Tech

Bracket

For years after the third-place game, North Carolina hung a banner in the Dean Smith Center that read "NIT 3RD PLACE 1973." The banner became the subject of ridicule from rival fans, and has since been removed.

See also
 1973 NCAA University Division basketball tournament
 1973 NCAA College Division basketball tournament
 1973 NAIA Division I men's basketball tournament
 1973 National Women's Invitational Tournament

References

National Invitation
National Invitation Tournament
1970s in Manhattan
Basketball in New York City
College sports in New York City
Madison Square Garden
National Invitation Tournament
National Invitation Tournament
Sports competitions in New York City
Sports in Manhattan